The 1998 Holy Cross Crusaders football team was an American football team that represented the College of the Holy Cross during the 1998 NCAA Division I-AA football season. Holy Cross tied for last in the Patriot League. 

In their third year under head coach Dan Allen, the Crusaders compiled a 2–9 record. Bob Andrews, John Aloisi, Joel Beck and Barrett Doxsey were the team captains.

The Crusaders were outscored 234 to 168. Their 1–5 conference record tied for sixth (and worst) in the seven-team Patriot League standings. 

Holy Cross played its home games at Fitton Field on the college campus in Worcester, Massachusetts.

Schedule

References

Holy Cross
Holy Cross Crusaders football seasons
Holy Cross Crusaders football